Pyrgulopsis licina, is a species of minute freshwater snails with an operculum, aquatic gastropod molluscs or micromolluscs in the family Hydrobiidae.

This species is endemic to Ash Meadows along the Amargosa River in Nevada, United States.  Its natural habitat is springs.

Description
It has an absence of glands on its penis and a strongly curved penial filament leading to its name P. licina from the Latin licinus, meaning bent or turned upward.

References

 

Molluscs of the United States
licina
Gastropods described in 2013